Amitava Bose was a professor of economics at Indian Institute of Management Calcutta. He was also a former director of IIM-C.

Education
Bose received his B.A. degree in Economics from Presidency College of the University of Calcutta, in 1967, and MA degree in economics with First Rank from the Delhi School of Economics in 1969. Bose completed his Ph.D. programme from University of Rochester in 1974.

Career

In the past, Professor Bose held teaching and/or research positions at Indian Statistical Institute, Cornell University and the University of Calcutta. Bose joined IIM-C in 1974 as an Assistant Professor, and was a professor at the institute since 1980. At IIM-C, Bose took several advanced courses in Economics, including Advanced Macroeconomics, Development Economics, Economics of the Firm, Cost-Benefit Analysis, Value Theory, Advanced Economic Theory, and General Equilibrium Theory.

Amitava Bose was the director of IIM Calcutta in the period from June 1997 to September 2002.

Select bibliography
 Bose, Rakshit & Sinha (1997) "Issues in Economic Theory and Public Policy: Essays in Honour of Professor Tapas Majumdar", Oxford University Press India 
 Bose & Ray (2001) "Contemporary Macroeconomics", Oxford University Press

References

External links
 Indian Institute of Management Calcutta – Faculty Information
 Indian Institute of Management Calcutta – Economics Group Faculty
 Indian Institute of Management Calcutta

Academic staff of the Indian Institute of Management Calcutta
20th-century Indian economists
Living people
University of Calcutta alumni
Academic staff of the University of Calcutta
Cornell University faculty
1947 births
21st-century Indian economists
Scholars from Kolkata
Indian expatriates in the United States